Norwegian Canadians refer to Canadian citizens who identify themselves as being of full or partial Norwegian ancestry, or people who emigrated from Norway and reside in Canada.

Norwegians are one of the largest northern  European ethnic groups in the country and have contributed greatly to its culture, especially in Western Canada.

According to the Canada 2016 Census there were 463,275 Canadians, or 1.3%, who claimed Norwegian ancestry, having an increase compared to those 452,705 in the 2011 Census. 

Significant Norwegian immigration took place from the mid-1880s to 1930.

History

Viking exploration 

Norwegians have played important roles in the history of Canada. The first Europeans to reach North America were Icelandic Norsemen, who made at least one major effort at settlement in what is today the Canadian province of Newfoundland and Labrador (L'Anse aux Meadows) around 1000 AD. Snorri Thorfinnsson aka Snorri Guðriðsson, the son of Thorfinn Karlsefni and his wife Guđriđ, is thought to be the first white baby born in Canada and North America.

In 1960 archaeological evidence of the only known Norse settlement in North America (outside of Greenland) was found at L'Anse aux Meadows on the northern tip of the island of Newfoundland, in what is now the Canadian province of Newfoundland and Labrador. Although this proved conclusively the Vikings' pre-Columbian discovery of North America, whether this exact site is the Vinland of the Norse accounts is still a subject of debate. There is a consensus among scholars that the Vikings did reach North America, approximately five centuries prior to the voyages of Christopher Columbus.

The main sources of information about the Norse voyages to Vinland are two Icelandic sagas, The Saga of Eric the Red and the Saga of the Greenlanders. These stories were preserved by oral tradition until they were written down some 250 years after the events they describe. The existence of two versions of the story shows some of the challenges of using traditional sources for history, because they share a large number of story elements, but use them in different ways. For example, both sagas feature a mariner called Bjarni, who is driven off course on a voyage to Greenland, and whose authority is subsequently called into question; in "Greenlanders" he is Bjarni Herjolfsson, who discovers the American mainland as a result of his mishap, but in "Eric" he is Bjarni Grimolfsson, who is driven into an area infested with shipworms on the way home from Vinland, with the result that his ship sinks. A brief summary of the plots of the two sagas shows many more examples.

Organized immigration
The major reason for Norwegian migration appears to be one of economics. Farms in Norway were often small and unable to support a family. Added to that was the lack of other employment to augment the family income. Between 1850 and 1910 approximately 681,011 Norwegians made their way to North America. Very few originally stayed in Canada but some, after a stay in the American Midwest, made their way across the border and settled in the present provinces of Alberta and Saskatchewan. One of the earliest Norwegian parties to America in the nineteenth century sailed from Stavanger. This party was led by Kleng Pedersen (Cleng Peerson). The ship, Restauration, of 45 tons, master being Helland, was a rebuilt sloop carrying 52 passengers. To that number was added baby Larson, who was born on the voyage. Many of this party were Quakers, leaving Norway for religious reasons. The voyage took 97 days and they arrived in New York on October 9, 1825. In 1836 the Norden and Den Norske Klippe sailed to America with 167 passengers. Another two vessels sailed the following year.

The British Government repealed the navigation laws in 1849 and from 1850 on, Canada became the port of choice as Norwegian ships carried passengers to Canada and took lumber back to Britain. The Canadian route offered many advantages to the emigrant. "They moved on from Quebec by rail and by steamer for another thousand or more miles for a steerage fare of slightly less than $9.00. Steamers from Quebec brought them to Toronto, then the immigrants often traveled by rail for 93 miles to Collingwood on Lake Huron, from where steamers transported them across Lake Michigan to Chicago, Milwaukee and Green Bay." In 1855 there were eight vessels reported from Norway to Canada in the immigration report, averaging a 45-day crossing. These vessels carried 1,275 passengers. The following year, 14 vessels made the voyage averaging 54 days, and carrying 2,821 passengers. One of these vessels, the Orion from Stavanger, was said to carry 50 paupers all heading for the American West but, due to a lack of funds were sent to Buffalo. The passengers of the Gifion, all proceeded to Wisconsin.

There were a considerable number of deaths among the Norwegians in 1857. Of the 6,507 immigrants who arrived in that year there were 100 deaths. In 1859, however, emigration dropped off with only 16 vessels arriving from Norway carrying 1,756 passengers. Of the over 28,460 Norwegians who came to Canada in the 1850s it is estimated that only 400 remained in Canada the majority moved on into the American west. A small settlement of Norwegians was begun at Gaspe Peninsula, Lower Canada, in 1854. A report in 1859, stated that 25 families, totaling 126 persons, were settled in the Gaspe. They were joined in 1860 by another 50 persons. However, the Norwegians were not content, and after a very hard winter in 1861-2 they began to make their way to the American Midwest. About 14 families who arrived on the ship Flora from Kristiania in 1856 went to the Eastern Townships, near present-day Sherbrooke. They were following in the footsteps of two other Norwegians who settled in this area in 1853. Johan Schroder, who travelled in the United States and Canada in 1863, reported that a group of Norwegian immigrants, led by an agent, settled in Bury in the Eastern Townships in 1856. One of the first settlers in this area was Captain John Svenson who died in 1878.

Settlements

Norwegian Canadians are found throughout the entire country but with a major concentration in Western Canada. The Prairies were the hub of the Norwegian settlement in Canada.

Settlements in Canada which were primarily created by Norwegian immigrants:

 Birch Hills, Saskatchewan
 Rose Valley, Saskatchewan
 Hagensborg, British Columbia
 Tallheo, British Columbia
 Delta, British Columbia
 Quatsino, British Columbia
 Pemberton, British Columbia (originally Agerton)
 New Norway, Alberta
 Norway, Ontario (now Upper Beaches, but probably named after Norway Pines not Norwegian immigrants)

Culture and traditions

Language
Most second or third generation Norwegian Canadians today are anglophone, others are bilingual or francophone (particularly in Quebec). Older generations or recent arrivals from Norway may still be allophone (Norwegian as their mother tongue).

Today

Canada is also the home of Little Norway and Camp Norway, both Norwegian military training facilities, during the Second World War, and the port of Halifax was a refuge for the Norwegian merchant marine and Royal Norwegian Navy during the same conflict.

Norwegian population in Canada (2016)

According to Statistics Canada figures from the 2016 census, 463,275 Canadians reported themselves as being of Norwegian descent (multiple responses were allowed). The figures are also broken down by provinces and territories for Norwegians:

Norwegian language by province (2016)

List of Canadians of Norwegian descent

Actors

 Melody Anderson, social worker and public speaker specializing in the impact of addiction on families; also known as an actress
 Earl W. Bascom, actor who worked with cowboy singer Roy Rogers
 Melyssa Ford, model/actress
 Nathan Fillion, actor
 Christopher Heyerdahl, actor, plays a Norwegian on the AMC TV series Hell on Wheels
 Natassia Malthe, Norwegian model and actress who grew up in Canada
 John Qualen, actor, born Johan Mandt Kvalen in Vancouver, British Columbia in 1899, the son of Norwegian immigrants 
 Rachel Skarsten, actress
 Vlasta Vrana, actor

Artists
 Earl W. Bascom, western artist, sculptor, "Cowboy of Cowboy Artists"

Athletes

 Glenn Anderson, retired professional hockey player
 Earl W. Bascom, rodeo pioneer, Canada's Sports Hall of Fame inductee, "Father of Modern Rodeo"
 Jeff Friesen, retired professional hockey player
 Kristina Groves, Olympic speed skater
 John Halvorsen, Olympic Track and Field Distance Runner
 Rick Hansen, wheelchair celebrity and philanthropist 
 Anne Heggtveit, alpine skier
 Ryder Hesjedal, professional road cyclist
George Knudson, CM, professional golfer; along with Mike Weir holds the record for the Canadian with the most wins on the PGA Tour, with eight career victories
 Johann Olav Koss, former Norwegian speed skater, Toronto, ON
 Karen Magnussen, Olympic figure skater, North Vancouver, BC
 Christine Nordhagen, Norwegian-Canadian Olympic female wrestler
 Pat Onstad, professional soccer goalkeeper
 Terry Puhl, former professional baseball player; currently the head coach of University of Houston-Victoria's baseball team
 Ryan Rishaug, former ice hockey player; currently a sports commentator on The Sports Network
 Cliff Ronning, professional hockey player
 Herman "Jackrabbit" Smith-Johannsen (1875–1987), Norwegian-Canadian cross country skier; lived to be 111 years old
 Staal brothers, four ice hockey players, all currently signed with the NHL
 Svein Tuft, professional road cyclist
 Hans Skinstad, Norwegian-Canadian 1976 Olympic cross country skier

Explorers
 Henry Larsen, Norwegian born Canadian Arctic seaman for the Royal Canadian Mounted Police; second to traverse Canada's Northwest Passage in the famous St. Roch

Filmmakers
 Torill Kove, Norwegian-Canadian film director and animator; Academy Award winner for the animated short film The Danish Poet

Musicians
 Endre Johannes Cleven, musician/composer and founder of the Canadian Viking Regiment (197th Battalion, Canadian Expeditionary Force)
 Mitch Dorge, musician
 Glenn Gould, pianist
 Bruce Haack, Norwegian-Canadian musician and composer
 Joni Mitchell, singer/songwriter
 Leif Vollebekk, musician

Politicians
 Aaron Paquette, politician, writer and artist
 Cam Broten, Saskatchewan NDP MLA for Saskatoon Massey Place
 Ione Christensen, CM, former Canadian Senator
 Nellie Cournoyea, served as Premier of the Northwest Territories from 1991 to 1995
 David Eggen, Alberta NDP MLA for Edmonton-Calder
 Colin Hansen, British Columbia's Minister of Finance and Minister; responsible for the 2010 Winter Olympics
 Hans Lars Helgesen, MLA for Esquimalt, 1878–1886; the first non-Briton to serve in the BC legislature and prominent in the establishment of the commercial fishery in Haida Gwaii
 Chuck Strahl, MP for Chilliwack-Fraser Canyon and Minister of Indian Affairs and Northern Development

Writers
 Holly Nelson, poet, writer and political activist
 Martha Ostenso, novelist, poet and screenwriter
 Sonja Skarstedt, poet, short story, and play writer; painter and illustrator
 Fred Stenson, writer of historical fiction and non-fiction relating to the Canadian West

Others
 Gerda Hnatyshyn, president and chair of the Hnatyshyn Foundation, an arts granting organization
 Norman Wolfred Kittson, fur trader, steamboat-line operator, and railway entrepreneur
 Peter Norman Nissen, inventor
 Paul Thorlakson, physician and Chancellor of the University of Winnipeg
 Jordan Peterson, professor of Psychology at the University of Toronto

See also

 Norwegian diaspora
 Canada–Norway relations
 European Canadians
 Icelandic Canadians
 Danish Canadians
 Swedish Canadians
 Dutch Canadians
 Flemish Canadians

References

 

Norway
 

Norwegian diaspora